James "Boo" Jackson (born December 16, 1981) is an American retired basketball player.

College career
Jackson played college basketball for Eastern Michigan.

Professional career
After his graduation from Eastern Michigan, he played for the Holland Blast in the International Basketball League (IBL) and the East Kentucky Miners of the Continental Basketball Association (CBA), where he was named Newcomer of the Year and earned All-CBA First Team honors. He last played for the Laval Kebs of the National Basketball League of Canada (NBL), following a professional career that took him to countries such as the United Arab Emirates, Argentina, Venezuela, Germany, China, and Norway. In Canada, Jackson was named to the NBL Canada All-Star reserve team. Jackson also had a history in the NBA Development League, appearing for the Bakersfield Jam, Los Angeles D-Fenders, and Dakota Wizards from 2009 to 2010.

References

External links 
 James Jackson at USBasket.com
 Boo Jackson at RealGM
 FIBA.com profile

1981 births
Living people
American expatriate basketball people in Argentina
American expatriate basketball people in Canada
American expatriate basketball people in China
American expatriate basketball people in Germany
American expatriate basketball people in Italy
American expatriate basketball people in Lebanon
American expatriate basketball people in Norway
American expatriate basketball people in Saudi Arabia
American expatriate basketball people in the Netherlands
American expatriate basketball people in the United Arab Emirates
American expatriate basketball people in Venezuela
American men's basketball players
Bakersfield Jam players
Basketball players from Pittsburgh
Dakota Wizards players
Eastern Michigan Eagles men's basketball players
Los Angeles D-Fenders players
Laval Kebs players
Forwards (basketball)